Xavier Rodriguez (born September 20, 1961) is an American attorney and jurist serving as a United States district judge of the United States District Court for the Western District of Texas. Rodriguez was previously an associate justice of the Texas Supreme Court from 2001 to 2002.

Early life and education
Rodriguez was born in 1961 in San Antonio, Texas. He received his Bachelor of Arts degree in history from Harvard University, a Master of Public Administration degree from the Lyndon B. Johnson School of Public Affairs at the University of Texas, and a Juris Doctor from the University of Texas Law School.

Career
He served in the United States Army Reserve as an officer from 1983 to 1993 after receiving his commission from the ROTC program at Massachusetts Institute of Technology.

Rodriguez is a regular speaker on continuing legal education seminars and has authored numerous articles regarding employment law, discovery and arbitration issues. He is past chair of the State Bar of Texas Labor and Employment Council and chair of the State Bar Paralegal Committee.

Prior to assuming the bench, he was a partner in the international law firm of Fulbright & Jaworski. Rodriguez then served on the Supreme Court of Texas until he was defeated in his re-election run. Rodriguez then returned to private practice briefly before being appointed to the United States District Court for the Western District of Texas in San Antonio by President George W. Bush.

Federal judicial service
On May 1, 2003, President George W. Bush nominated Rodriguez to the United States District Court for the Western District of Texas to a seat vacated by Judge Edward C. Prado, who was elevated to the 5th Circuit Court on May, 13, 2003. He was confirmed by the United States Senate on July 31, 2003. He received his commission on August 1, 2003. Rodriguez has been considered a candidate for a vacancy on the United States Court of Appeals for the Fifth Circuit, along with District Judge Marina Marmolejo.

See also
List of Hispanic/Latino American jurists

References

External links

1961 births
Living people
Harvard College alumni
Hispanic and Latino American judges
Judges of the United States District Court for the Western District of Texas
People from San Antonio
Texas Republicans
Justices of the Texas Supreme Court
United States district court judges appointed by George W. Bush
21st-century American judges
Lyndon B. Johnson School of Public Affairs alumni